Jiaoxi Township or Chiaohsi Township is a rural township in the northern section of Yilan County, Taiwan.

Geography

 Area: 101.43 km²
 Population: 34,807 people (February 2023)

Administrative divisions
The township includes eighteen rural villages:
Baiyun, Yushi (Yushih), Deyang, Dazhong, Dayi, Liujie, Erlong, Shichao, Yutian, Sanmin, Linmei, Baie, Yuguang, Guangwu, Wusha, Longtan, Paolun and Erjie Village.

Education
 Fo Guang University
Tamkang University Lanyang Campus

Tourist attractions

Jiaoxi is famous for its hot springs. These attract large numbers of visitors so as the result, Jiaoxi has become a favorite weekend resort, mostly people from Taipei, featuring an array of hotels from the budget to the luxurious. There is also a few free public hot springs, mostly sheltered, where visitors can enjoy a leisurely foot bath at any time.

In March 2012, it was named one of the Top 10 Small Tourist Towns by the Tourism Bureau of Taiwan.

Other notable points of interests include:

 Wufengqi Waterfall

Events
 Jiaoxi Hot Spring Festival

Transportation

Jiaoxi is served by Jiaoxi Station on the Yilan Line run by the Taiwan Railways Administration. Another convenient way of transportation to/from Taipei and further to Yilan City is by bus route that uses the National Freeway 5 and passes through the Snow Mountain Tunnel. It is operated by Kamalan Bus Inc. and Capital Star (首都之星). The Provincial Highway 9 also serves the township.

Notable natives
 Chang Chuan-tien, member of Legislative Yuan (1999–2006)
 Lai In-jaw, President of Control Yuan (2007-2010)
 Wu Tze-cheng, Minister of Public Construction Commission

References

External links

  
 2019 礁溪溫泉盃櫻花陵園馬拉松宣傳影片 ('2019 Jiaoxi Hot Springs Cup, Cherry Memorial Park Marathon Publicity Clip') 

Townships in Yilan County, Taiwan